Jonathan Sweet (born 21 August 1973) is an Australian freestyle skier. He competed in the men's aerials event at the 1998 Winter Olympics.

References

External links
 

1973 births
Living people
Australian male freestyle skiers
Olympic freestyle skiers of Australia
Freestyle skiers at the 1998 Winter Olympics
Skiers from Melbourne